Hubert Dijk (born 8 August 1978) is a Dutch retired professional footballer who played as a striker.

Club career
Born in Amersfoort, Dijk made over 100 appearances in the Dutch league for Go Ahead Eagles and TOP Oss. He joined amateur side Excelsior '31 in summer 2004.

Personal life
Dijk works for the Apeldoorn Municipality.

References

External links
  Profile at Voetbal International

1978 births
Living people
Sportspeople from Amersfoort
Association football forwards
Dutch footballers
Go Ahead Eagles players
TOP Oss players
Eerste Divisie players
Footballers from Utrecht (province)